A Hecuba-gap asteroid is a member of a dynamical group of resonant asteroids located in the Hecuba gap at 3.27 AU – one of the largest Kirkwood gaps in the asteroid belt, which is considered the borderline separating the outer main belt asteroids from the Cybeles. A Hecuba-gap asteroid stays in a 2:1 mean motion resonance with the gas giant Jupiter, which may gradually perturbe its orbits over a long period until it either intersect with the orbit of Mars or Jupiter itself. Depending on the dynamical stability of an asteroid's orbit in the Hecuba gap, three subgroups have been proposed. These are the marginally unstable Griqua asteroids, with an estimated lifetime of more than 100 million years, the stable Zhongguo asteroids (more than 500 million or even 1 billion years), and an unnamed, strongly unstable population of asteroids with a dynamical lifetime of less than 70 million years.

Moving further out the Solar System, the asteroids in the Hecuba gap are followed by the resonant Cybeles (7:4), Hildas (3:2), Thules (4:3) and Jupiter trojans (1:1).

Description 

Both the Zhongguo (stable) and Griqua asteroids (marginally stable) are also described as the "long-lived" group with lifetimes over 70 million years in order to distinct them from the "short-lived" population. The division between the Griquas and Zhongguo into clearly distinct groups in terms of lifetime has also been questioned and follow-up studies have moved the threshold lifetime between the two long-lived groups from 500 million to 1 billion years.

Griqua asteroids  

The Griqua asteroids (also known as the "Griquas") are a dynamical group of asteroids with marginally unstable orbits. The group derives its name from the asteroid 1362 Griqua. The Griquas are located in the Hecuba gap – one of the largest Kirkwood gaps in the asteroid belt at 3.27 AU – and stay in a 2:1 mean motion resonance with the gas giant Jupiter, which gradually perturbes their orbits over a long period until they either intersect with the orbit of Mars or Jupiter itself. The group has an estimated lifetime of 100 to (at least) 500 million years. Known members of the Griqua group include (articles in boldface):

 1362 Griqua
 3688 Navajo
 4177 Kohman
 11665 Dirichlet
 13963 Euphrates

Zhongguo asteroids 

While the Griquas are asteroids in a marginally unstable orbit, the Zhongguo asteroids (or "Zhongguos"; named after 3789 Zhongguo) are in a rather stable 1:2 resonance with Jupiter. The group of 26 identified members, with a lifetime of more than 530 million (or even 1 billion) years, can be further divided into two clusters in the pseudo-proper element space: 

 3789 Zhongguo
 
 11266 Macke
 11573 Helmholtz
 14871 Pyramus
 
 
 22740 Rayleigh
 
 
 31249 Renéefleming
 
 
 
 
 
 
 
 45511 Anneblack

Strongly unstable group 

Related but distinct from the "long-lived" Griquas and Zhongguos, is the group of "unstable" Hecuba-gap asteroids:

 1921 Pala
 1922 Zulu
 5201 Ferraz-Mello
 5370 Taranis
 8373 Stephengould
 9767 Midsomer Norton
 
 
 
 
 
 65541 Kasbek
 
 
 
 

In 2005, further research expanded this group of 16 bodies with an additional 31 multi-opposition asteroids, that show life-times of less than 70 million years. It is also thought that approximately 25% of the short-lived population are "extremely unstable" with lifetimes of less than 2 million years.

 
 
 
 
 
 
 
 
 
 
 
 
 
 
 
 
 
 
 
 
 
 
 
 
 
 
 
 
 
 
 

Among the unstable population, some asteroids have such a high eccentricity with a perihelion of less than 1.3 AU, that qualifies them as a near-Earth object. These five bodies (with their current eccentricity taken from the JPL SBDB in parenthesis) are 5370 Taranis (0.64),  (0.65),  (0.70),  (0.66),  (0.72).

References

External links 
 On the Origin of the Long-Lived Asteroids in the 2:1 Mean-Motion Resonance with Jupiter, 8-slide presentation, Chrenko, 2014
 Dynamics of the Solar System – Publication overview, Miroslav Broz, Institute of Astronomy, Charles University
 EasySky, orbital diagram
 Minor planet groups/families, www.projectpluto.com